The Order of Merit of North Rhine-Westphalia is a civil order of merit,  of the German State of North Rhine-Westphalia.  The Order of Merit of North Rhine-Westphalia was founded on 11 March 1986. It is awarded to citizens representing all segments of the population who have made extraordinary contributions to the people and state of North Rhine-Westphalia. The order is limited to 2500 living recipients.  From its founding through January 2010, a total of 1,559 people have been awarded the Order of Merit of North Rhine-Westphalia.

References

External links 
 Administrative provisions to the Law on the Order of Merit of North Rhine-Westphalia 
 Verdienstorden des Landes Nordrhein-Westfalen 

North Rhine-Westphalia
North Rhine-Westphalia
Culture of North Rhine-Westphalia